Neunkirchen is an Ortsgemeinde – a community belonging to a Verbandsgemeinde – in the Westerwaldkreis in Rhineland-Palatinate, Germany.

Geography

The community lies in the Westerwald between the towns of Siegen (38 km to the north), Wetzlar (28 km to the east) and Limburg an der Lahn (19 km to the south). Neunkirchen is the southernmost place belonging to the Verbandsgemeinde of Rennerod – a kind of collective municipality – whose seat is in the like-named town.

References

Municipalities in Rhineland-Palatinate
Westerwaldkreis